The Oaths of Allegiance and Supremacy Act 1688 (1 Will. & Mar., c. 8) was an Act of the Parliament of England passed in the aftermath of the Glorious Revolution. The Act required all office-holders, Members of Parliament and clergy to take the oaths of allegiance and supremacy for the new monarchs, William III and Mary II. The Archbishop of Canterbury, William Sancroft, five bishops and approximately four hundred lower clergy refused to take the oaths because they believed their oaths to James II were still valid. The Act thus triggered the nonjuring schism in the Church of England. The non-jurors were deprived of their offices.

Notes

External links
 Text of the Act (British History online)

See also
 Oath of Allegiance (United Kingdom)
 Oath of Supremacy

Acts of the Parliament of England
1688 in law
1688 in England
Oaths of allegiance